The Department of Primary Industry was an Australian government department that existed between December 1975 and July 1987. It was the second so-named Australian Government department.

Scope
Information about the department's functions and/or government funding allocation could be found in the Administrative Arrangements Orders, the annual Portfolio Budget Statements and in the Department's annual reports.

According to the Administrative Arrangements Order issued 5 October 1976, the Department dealt with:
Agricultural and pastoral industries
Fisheries
Forestry

Structure
The Department was an Australian Public Service department, staffed by officials who were responsible to the Minister for Primary Industry.

References

Primary Industry
Ministries established in 1975